RHA is an acronym that may refer to:

 Rolled homogeneous armour
 Regional health authority (disambiguation)
 Religious Heritage of America
 Residence hall association
 Rice husk ash, a by-product from rice culture used as cement admixture
 Rivers and Harbors Act, any number of various acts of legislation of the United States Congress
 Road Haulage Association
 Royal Hibernian Academy
 Royal Horse Artillery
 RNA helicase, an enzyme

Rha may refer to:
 Rha, Netherlands, a population center in Steenderen
 Rhamnose, a monosaccharide
 Volga River (the ancient name of the river in Latin, from Ancient Greek Ῥᾶ, thought to be a borrowing from reconstructed Scythian *Rā or *Rahā)
 Rha (Cyrillic), a Cyrillic letter

Letters from alphabets that can be called rha:
 र, ड़', ढ़, र्ह — Devanagari letters which can be called ra, ṛa or rha;
 Ԗ — the 23rd letter rha («ра») in the older (1924−1927) Moksha language Cyrillic alphabet

See also
 Ra (disambiguation)